Queiroz (or Queiróz) is a Portuguese surname. It may refer to:

Queiroz
Agnelo Queiroz (born 1958), Brazilian politician
António Eça de Queiroz (1891–1968), Portuguese monarchist
Carlos Queiroz (born 1953), Portuguese football manager
Carolina Queiroz (born 1995), Brazilian freestyle swimmer
Clayson Queiroz (born 1978), Brazilian footballer
Diego Queiróz de Oliveira (born 1990), Brazilian footballer
Edson Queiroz (1925–1982), Brazilian entrepreneur
Eduardo de Queiroz (born 1936), Portuguese sailor and Olympic competitor
Francisca Queiroz (born 1979), Brazilian actress
Francisco Teixeira de Queiroz (1848–1919; pen named "Bento Moreno"), Portuguese novelist
Hélder Queiroz (born 1963), Brazilian conservation biologist, primatologist and fish behaviorist
Joaquim Queiróz (born 1971), Portuguese sprint canoer
José Maria de Eça de Queiroz (1845–1900), Portuguese author
Larissa Queiroz (born 1984), Brazilian actress
Liliana Queiroz (born 1985), Portuguese model
Manuel Queiróz (born 1883), Portuguese fencer and Olympic competitor
Maria Isaura Pereira de Queiróz (1918–2018), Brazilian sociologist
Protógenes Queiroz (born 1959), Brazilian Federal Police officer
Rachel de Queiroz (1910–2003), Brazilian author and journalist
Rodrigo José Queiroz Chagas (born 1973), Brazilian footballer
Ronan Queiroz de Paula Afonso (born 1994), Brazilian footballer
Ruy de Queiroz (born 1958), Brazilian philosopher of mathematics and electrical engineer
Sérgio de Queiroz Duarte (born 1934), Brazilian diplomat
Tácio Caetano Cruz Queiroz (born 1980), Brazilian footballer
Vinicius Queiroz (born 1983), Brazilian mixed martial artist
Viviane de Queiroz Pereira (born 1994; known as "Pocah" or "MC Pocahontas"), Brazilian singer and television personality
Wolney Queiroz (born 1972), Brazilian businessman and politician

See also
Queiros, a spelling variant of Queiroz
Queiroz, São Paulo, Brazilian municipality in the state of São Paulo

Portuguese-language surnames